The 2016 China Open was a tennis tournament played on outdoor hard courts. It was the 18th edition of the China Open for the men (20th for the women). It was part of ATP World Tour 500 series on the 2016 ATP World Tour, and the last WTA Premier Mandatory tournament of the 2016 WTA Tour. Both the men's and the women's events were held at the National Tennis Center in Beijing, China, from October 3 to October 9, 2016.

Points and prize money

Point distribution

Prize money

ATP singles main-draw entrants

Seeds 

 1 Rankings are as of September 26, 2016

Other entrants 
The following players received wildcards into the singles main draw:
  Lu Yen-hsun
  Dominic Thiem
  Zhang Ze

The following player using a protected ranking into the singles main draw:
  Florian Mayer

The following players received entry from the qualifying draw:  
  Kyle Edmund 
  Konstantin Kravchuk 
  Adrian Mannarino 
  John Millman

Withdrawals
Before the tournament
  Novak Djokovic →replaced by  Pablo Carreño Busta
  Jo-Wilfried Tsonga →replaced by  Andrey Kuznetsov
  John Isner →replaced by  Guido Pella

ATP doubles main-draw entrants

Seeds

 Rankings are as of September 26, 2016

Other entrants
The following pairs received wildcards into the doubles main draw:
  Andre Begemann /  Leander Paes 
  Gong Maoxin /  Zhang Ze

The following pair received entry from the qualifying draw:
  Paolo Lorenzi /  Guido Pella

WTA singles main-draw entrants

Seeds 

 Rankings are as of September 26, 2016

Other entrants 
The following players received wildcards into the singles main draw:
  Duan Yingying
  Sabine Lisicki
  Peng Shuai
  Wang Qiang
  Zheng Saisai
 
The following players received entry from the qualifying draw:
  Lara Arruabarrena 
  Louisa Chirico
  Nicole Gibbs 
  Julia Görges 
  Tatjana Maria 
  Alison Riske 
  Kateřina Siniaková 
  Wang Yafan

Withdrawals 
Before the tournament
  Kiki Bertens → replaced by  Zhang Shuai
  Eugenie Bouchard → replaced by  Yaroslava Shvedova
  Sara Errani → replaced by  Danka Kovinić
  Anna-Lena Friedsam → replaced by  Mirjana Lučić-Baroni
  Karin Knapp → replaced by  Shelby Rogers
  Sloane Stephens → replaced by  Anastasija Sevastova
  Ana Ivanovic → replaced by  Madison Brengle
  Andrea Petkovic → replaced by  Christina McHale
  Serena Williams (shoulder injury) → replaced by  Caroline Wozniacki

WTA doubles main-draw entrants

Seeds

1 Rankings are as of September 26, 2016

Other entrants
The following pairs received wildcards into the doubles main draw:
  Timea Bacsinszky /  Jeļena Ostapenko 
  Christina McHale /  Peng Shuai 
  Laura Siegemund /  Elina Svitolina 
  You Xiaodi /  Zhu Lin

Finals

Men's singles

 Andy Murray  defeated  Grigor Dimitrov, 6–4, 7–6(7–2)

Women's singles

 Agnieszka Radwańska defeated  Johanna Konta, 6−4, 6−2

Men's doubles

  Pablo Carreño Busta /  Rafael Nadal defeated  Jack Sock /  Bernard Tomic, 6−7(6−8), 6−2, [10−8]

Women's doubles

  Bethanie Mattek-Sands /  Lucie Šafářová defeated  Caroline Garcia /  Kristina Mladenovic, 6−4, 6−4

References

External links
Official Website